Allan Fa'alava'au (born 15 November 1993) is a professional rugby union player. He represents Australia in sevens rugby. Born in Auckland, New Zealand and playing for Endeavour Hills at a club level, he debuted for Australia in February 2012. As of December 2015, he currently has 21 caps.

A butcher by trade, Allan Fa'alava'au impressed during his first season with the Australian Men’s Sevens side after being called up as injury cover for the Las Vegas 7s in 2012. A former Australian Schools representative, Allan continued to add to his already impressive resume in 2012 when he was named to the Australian Under-20 side for the Junior World Championship in South Africa. He was granted his Australian citizenship in November 2014. Representative honours include the Australian Schools (2011) and Australian Under-20 (2012).

He competed at the 2016 Summer Olympics.

References

External links 
 
 
 
 
 

1993 births
Australian rugby union players
Male rugby sevens players
Australia international rugby sevens players
Rugby union players from Auckland
New Zealand emigrants to Australia
Living people
Rugby sevens players at the 2016 Summer Olympics
Olympic rugby sevens players of Australia